Schjeldahl is a surname. Notable people with the surname include:

 Gilmore Schjeldahl (1912–2002), American businessman and inventor
 Peter Schjeldahl (1942–2022), American art critic, poet, and educator